Non ci resta che piangere (English: Nothing Left to Do But Cry) is a 1984 Italian fantasy comedy film written, directed and starring Roberto Benigni and Massimo Troisi.

Plot 
Tuscan countryside. The janitor Mario and the teacher Saverio are stopped at a level crossing, waiting for the train to pass. The two are friends and trust each other. Among other things, Saverio is worried about his sister Gabriella, who fell into depression for the failure of her relationship with an American boy. The wait continues and decide to travel a road in the fields. After a while they remain in cream with the car in the middle of the countryside. You do evening, it rains. The two find accommodation in an inn for the night, in a room that already hosts another person.

The next morning as soon as they wake up they see, having fun, the guest urinating from the window, but their laughter are immediately truncated by the hiss of a spear that kills him. Mario and Saverio see fonding people in the black cloak on horseback, rush to the ground floor and find other people, dressed in a very strange way. Increducts make themselves be said by a man where they find themselves and discover that they are fried, an imaginary Tuscan village, in 1492. considering it first a terrible joke, they must resign themselves to the harsh reality making themselves hosting from Vitellozzo, the brother of the killed man, Remigio, who tells them of a terrible feud with such a Giuliano del Capecchio, who is exterminating his family. Once in the village they know Parisina, a mother of Vitellozzo and the late Remigio and begin to work in their slaughter shop.

In the Renaissance context of the village, the most disparate episodes happen. Saverio immediately seems comfortable, while Mario does not want to settle down; Soon, however, during a religious function, Mario makes the acquaintance of Pia, a girl of a rich family, with whom he begins to see himself looking out from the surrounding wall of her house. In the meantime, Vitellozzo is arrested and Saverio and Mario write a letter to Girolamo Savonarola in vain to obtain his liberation.

Saverio (who continues to tell Mario to ask Pia if he has an friend to introduce him) does not hide a certain annoyance for the meetings between Mario and the young Pia and complains that he always remains and only him to work in the butcher shop. Driven by his political-intellectual ardor, he convinces his friend to travel to Spain, in order to reach Christopher Columbus and dissuade him from leaving for the Indies and discovering America, so that, in the future, his sister cannot meet the American boy who left her. In an unspecified place the two come across a beautiful Amazon, Astriaha, which intimidates them by throwing an arrow against their wagon.

At this point the story differs depending on the version, standard or extended.

Standard version 
In France, Mario and Saverio come across Leonardo da Vinci, and driven by an unstoppable enthusiasm try to propose the knowledge of current inventions but given their own ignorance and the distance from the knowledge of the genius, starting from the train, the thermometer, the Electricity and the traffic light, the two then must resign themselves to explain the game of the broom.

In a tavern the two meet Astriaha, who tells them that the task of her was to prevent the arrival in Spain of any foreigner, to guarantee the departure of Colombo ships. At these words the two remain stunned: "Columbus has already left?!" they rush to the ocean without seeing the caravels at all.

The two try to return to Italy and with amazement they see the smoke of a locomotive. Convinced that they have returned to the twentieth century, they reluctantly discover that the driver is Leonardo, who treasured their teachings and, seeing their disappointment, reassures them on the proceeds of the deal to be divided into equal parts : «Have Mercy! Thirty-three, thirty-three and thirty-three!».

Extended version 
In the editing of the scene, the meeting with Leonardo is anticipated to make the events that concern Astriaha.

The girl says that because of them she hasn't sleeps and has not eaten for three days and order them to return to their boss, Alonso. Mario and Saverio do not know who Alonso is and try to clear themselves. The girl has passes out, Saverio helps her and he immediately falls in love with her. Recovered, Astriaha forces the two to follow her to their father. Saverio continually courts her, but she does not seem to correspond. One night she reaches Mario in a stable and they make love. Saverio sees them and the next morning, desperate, he decides to take revenge. While Mario rests near a river, Saverio speaks to Astriaha and confides that Mario is truly a man from Alonso.

The woman, disdain, runs away. Mario gets angry, the two fight, beat each other, chase each other until they reach a beach. Together they call the name of Columbus at the top of the lift, but they discover that the three caravels have already started. Disconsolate, Saverio reveals to Mario the real reason why he wanted to stop the navigator : "Fred, my sister's boyfriend was American, he was of the NATO of Pisa. If i, for five minutes i could stop Colombo, that imbecile would not be born and my sister would've been fine."

The two versions joint in the scene of the beach race.

Production

Filming 
Benigni and Troisi in an interview said that the famous scene in which the customs pass was shot over and over again because the two were unable to remain serious. The two comedians, halfway through the film, had shot so much superfluous material that they were forced to erase some episodes, such as the one that should have been wearing the common friend Marco Messeri the role of Savonarola. The scene in which Benigni and Troisi write the letter to Girolamo Savonarola is a tribute to the scene of the film Totò, Peppino and the ... Malafemmina, in which the protagonists write a letter bewitched for his nephew's girlfriend. During registration in the Umbrian countryside a joke was made to Carlo Monni (Vitellozzo in the film). Benigni and Troisi made him pronounce scurrilous things about Amanda Sandrelli's mother, Stefania, an actress then in vogue. Amanda, who had listened to the two, went to Carlo Monni's camper and gave him a slap.

Places 
Some scenes from the film were shot at the Bracciano hospital and at the Capranica Scalo station, where the famous level crossing is located. The famous "Della Dogana" scene was shot in Paliano, inside the La Selva Nature Reserve. So also the final scene with the locomotive of group 400 of the Calabro Lucane Mediterranean railways, which today lies on a tronchino by rusting. The scene of the meeting with Leonardo da Vinci has turned on the banks of the Pellicone pond, near Vulci, in the Lazio Maremma, inside the Etruscan archaeological area of the same name. Some scenes of three men and one leg with Aldo, Giovanni and Giacomo were shot at the same lake. The path that leads to the lake presents a sign with the photos of these films, testifying the place as a film set. The beach scene was shot in Cala di Forno - Municipality of Magliano in Tuscany - in the heart of the Maremma Natural Park.

Distribution 
Three different versions were distributed of the film, one of which diverges for the ending: this version, never distributed for the home video market in any format, was the result of a different assembly for the broadcast on television (aired on the Rai networks , Fininvest as well as on various cable TV broadcasters). The film was broadcast, in the first TV view, Monday 8 December 1986, at 20.30, on Canale 5. 

In 2006 a DVD edition was released with a new extensive version of the film, longer of 18 minutes to present a greater development of the Astriaha character. In March 2015 the film returned to Italian cinemas thanks to the Lucky Red, which distributed a restored version of the comedy.

Cast
 Roberto Benigni as Saverio
 Massimo Troisi as Mario
 Iris Peynado as Astriaha
 Amanda Sandrelli as Pia
 Paolo Bonacelli as Leonardo da Vinci 
 Carlo Monni: Vitellozzo

Reception
The film was the highest-grossing film in Italy for the year with a gross of $2.89 million (5.78 billion lire) from 12 key cities.

See also
List of time travel science fiction films
Leonardo da Vinci in fiction

References

External links
 
 

1984 films
Films about time travel
Films directed by Roberto Benigni
Films directed by Massimo Troisi
1980s science fiction comedy films
Italian science fiction comedy films
Films scored by Pino Donaggio
Cultural depictions of Leonardo da Vinci
Films set in the 15th century
Films set in the 16th century
1984 comedy films
1980s Italian-language films
1980s Italian films